Jess Willard Pike (July 31, 1915 – March 28, 1984) was a Major League Baseball outfielder. He played part of the  season for the New York Giants.

Before and after his brief major league stint, Pike played in the minor leagues for sixteen years in total, from  until . He began his career as a pitcher with the Monahans Trojans of the West Texas–New Mexico League, but by  he had been converted to the outfield.

Sources

Major League Baseball outfielders
New York Giants (NL) players
Monahans Trojans players
Cedar Rapids Raiders players
Buffalo Bisons (minor league) players
Winston-Salem Twins players
Elmira Pioneers players
Knoxville Smokies players
Oklahoma City Indians players
Savannah Indians players
Indianapolis Indians players
Jersey City Giants players
Charleston Rebels players
Bakersfield Indians players
Modesto Reds players
Baseball players from Oklahoma
1915 births
1984 deaths